Jung Ki-yeol (born December 5, 1981), known professionally as Kai, is a South Korean singer and musical theatre actor. He is a classically-trained baritone best known in musical theatre and has starred in Korean productions of A Tale of Two Cities, The Three Musketeers and Phantom. Outside of musical theatre, Kai has appeared as a panelist on various singing variety shows such as King of Mask Singer and was host of the classical music show 세상의 모든 음악 (Music of the World) on KBS Classic FM.

Early life and education
Kai grew up in a musical home and began singing as a child at a local children's choir. He attended Seoul Arts High School and graduated from Seoul National University where he majored in voice. He continued with graduate studies at his alma mater after completing his mandatory military service. In 2009, he completed his master's degree and wrote his thesis on the music of Modest Musorgsky.

Career

Early career
Despite having an academic background in classical music, Kai decided to pursue a career in the classical crossover genre, which was still relatively new in South Korea at that time. In a 2009 interview, Kai stated that he had shocked his professors and was met with opposition from most of them when he announced his intention to be a crossover singer rather than pursue a career in opera, as many of his peers had done. His decision was influenced by his professor, retired tenor Park In-soo, whose 1989 hit duet "Nostalgia" (향수) with folk singer Lee Dong-won is considered to be one of the earliest commercially-successful classical crossover Korean songs; Park himself was expelled by the Korea National Opera and ostracized by the domestic classical music community after the song was released due to the staunch conservative and segregationist attitudes still prevalent at that time.

Kai split his time between performing popular music at various festivals and standard classical opera repertoire at concert halls in an attempt to challenge the prevailing perception that classically-trained singers would lose their singing skills if they dabbled in popular music. He gained wider public recognition after featuring as a guest artist at the 2009 nation-wide concert tour of renowned Korean operatic soprano Sumi Jo. Up until then, he had performed under the name "Kyul" (결), a portmanteau of his given name. Jo suggested "Kai" for his stage name as it was easier for non-Korean audiences to pronounce and he has used it ever since. 

In addition to performing, Kai also released a number of singles and albums and done guest vocals for other artists. For his 2009 maxi single, he collaborated with veteran K-pop composer and producer Kim Hyung-suk, known for his work with J. Y. Park among others, to produce original material rather than the common practice of reinterpreting traditional classical crossover repertoire. He released his first full-length studio album I AM KAI in March 2011 and it debuted at #92 on the Gaon Album Chart and rose to peak at #26 within three weeks. His releases have also topped the domestic classical charts, making him one of the earliest crossover artists to have charted in both the classical and Gaon charts simultaneously.

Musical theater
Kai made his musical theatre debut in the 2011 production of The Story of My Life. At that time, there were relatively few classically-trained singers active in musical theater, with fellow Seoul National University voice majors Ryu Jeong-han and Kim So-hyun being the two most prolific and well-known. Most musical actors and actresses were either pop singers or trained actors who later received vocal training.

Kai has been cast as authoritarian or "lofty" characters due to his powerful voice and starred as the protagonist in the Korean productions of many notable musicals, including A Tale of Two Cities, Phantom, The Three Musketeers and The Count of Monte Cristo. In 2017, he won critical acclaim and recognition for his roles as the eponymous character in the world premiere of Ben Hur, a Korean musical adaption of Ben-Hur: A Tale of the Christ, and as Crown Prince Rudolf in Rudolf (promoted in Korea as The Last Kiss). He was cast as King Arthur in the 2019 Seoul premiere of the Korean adaptation of Excalibur, which won rave reviews from both critics and audiences and was one of the best-selling musicals that year; due to its popularity, the musical was brought back in 2021 and Kai was one of several original cast members who returned. In late 2020 he was cast in the musical adaptation of The Sorrows of Young Werther and was nominated for Best Lead Actor at the 5th Korean Musical Awards.

Other activities
From 2010 to 2014, Kai was a DJ on KBS Classic FM's popular classical music show 세상의 모든 음악 (ko) (Music of the World), the South Korean equivalent of BBC Radio 3. He has also participated in singing variety shows such as Immortal Songs: Singing the Legend, the second season of I Am a Singer and King of Mask Singer. From 2017 to 2021 he was a regular panelist on King of Mask Singer as one of five "music specialists".

Outside of musical theater and concerts, Kai has performed at various Korea Tourism Organization-sponsored events throughout Asia to promote Korean musicals as a potential attraction for visiting tourists. He received a commendation from the Ministry of Culture, Sports and Tourism for his work.

Discography

Albums

Maxi singles

Soundtrack and singles contributions

Theater

Awards

Vocal competitions
2002: Schubert Society of Korea Competition – consolation prize (semi-finalist)
2007: Dong-a Music Competition – 3rd place, voice (male)
2009: Osaka International Music Competition (jp) – 3rd place, voice/opera category

Musical theater

References

External links

1981 births
Living people
South Korean male musical theatre actors
South Korean male singers
Seoul Arts High School alumni
Seoul National University alumni
South Korean baritones